Sterling County is a county located on the Edwards Plateau in the U.S. state of Texas. As of the 2020 census, its population was 1,372, making it the ninth-least populous county in Texas. Its county seat is Sterling City. The county is named for W. S. Sterling, an early settler in the area. Sterling County was one of 30 prohibition, or entirely dry, counties in the state of Texas, but is now a moist county.

History

Native Americans

Original native Plains Indians included Comanche, Lipan Apache, Kiowa, and Kickapoo.

The region had a number of violent encounters between the Comanche, local ranchmen, and Texas Rangers. A deadly skirmish occurred in the 1870s between area ranchmen and the Comanche on the Lacy Creek on the present day Campstool Ranch. “The Fight at Live Oak Mott” is an account of the events as written by W.K. Kellis, in the Sterling City News-Record, and later published in Frontier Times by J. Marvin Hunter. In 1879, the last significant battle between the Texas Rangers and the Comanche occurred on the "U" Ranch, at the time the ranch was owned by Earnest and Holland. The Comanches, led by the Quahada chief named Black Horse, left Fort Sill, Oklahoma, on May 29 with a group of 19 braves in a search for buffalo, and by June 29, they had yet to find any buffalo, so they killed a horse on the "U" Ranch, near the headwaters of the Concho River in Howard County, and an ensuing battle with the Texas Rangers soon followed. (I claim that this entire "raid" was probably not by Comanches—possibly by Apaches—but most likely non-Indian horse thieves. It was a cover-up of the mysterious killing of a Texas Ranger. And for the first time in Ranger history several of them were fired for cowardice. --Doyle Phillips)

Early settlements

Although the county was part of the 1842 Fisher–Miller Land Grant, no resulting settlement happened in the area.
Fur traders, Texas Rangers, and federal troops passed through the area between 1800 and 1860. Settlers began arriving after the American Civil War, after the demise of the buffalo herds and the departure of Indian tribes. Indian fighter and buffalo hunter W. S. Sterling settled in the area around 1858. Two decades later, Sterling became a U.S. Marshal in Arizona and was killed in an Apache ambush near Fort Apache. Fellow buffalo hunter S. J. Wiley also settled in the county about the same time as Sterling. According to legend, Frank and Jesse James hid out on Sterling Creek in the 1870s to raise horses and hunt buffalo. Camp Elizabeth began as a Texas Ranger camp circa 1853. It became an outpost hospital facility of Fort Concho in 1874–1886.

Open rangeland

During the era of the open range, the acreage owned by the large land and cattle outfits did not adjoin other pasturelands that were already owned, creating a checkered pattern of land ownership. This pattern was attributed to the system that allocated land between the railway companies and the State of Texas. The railway companies were given the odd-numbered sections (surveys), contingent upon surveying the entire block of land (townships), and the state retained ownership of the even-numbered sections. Thus, for each section it received, a railroad company had to survey an adjoining 640 acres for the state, and the railway companies were required to sell the land within 12 years of the initial survey. As a result, the large cattle ranches, often having the earliest presence in the area, initially consisted only of the odd-numbered sections within each block until adjoining acreage was acquired from the State of Texas, such as those lands sold by the Common School Fund.

The checkered pattern of land ownership did not create many problems during the time of the open range, as the large cattle outfits “controlled” vast amounts of open rangeland for grazing and could move cattle from pasture to pasture without having to compensate any other land owner or even the State.

However, after the large influx of settlers, the building of fences, and the restricted access to surface waters during drought, tensions escalated between the settlers and established cattle outfits and eventually lead to the Fence Cutting Wars.

Ranching

In the 1870s, the area was dominated by large land and cattle outfits such as the Half Circle S, established by the Peacock brothers; the MS, set up by Schuster, Henry, and Company; and the "U" Ranch, established by J.D. Earnest and W.J. Holland.

In 1880, Colonel William Randolph McEntire purchased the 80,000-acre (325-km2) "U" Ranch from M.B. Stephenson. Established in 1876 by J.D. Earnest and W.J. Holland, and later sold to M.B. Stephenson in 1879, the "U" Ranch was the first ranch established west of San Angelo in Tom Green County, Texas. The ranch was located about six miles northwest of Sterling City on the North Concho River extending northwestward through Glasscock County to the headwaters of the river in Howard County, the Sterling Creek (headwaters to the mouth of the river) in the east/southeast, the Renderbrook Spade Ranch in Mitchell County in the northeast and J.B. Slaughter's ranch in the northwest. The ranch itself consisted of three headquarters - one on the Concho, one at the mouth of Sterling Creek and one at the headwaters of Sterling Creek - and were twelve to twenty-five miles apart.

After subsequent land acquisitions, the "U" Ranch was enlarged to include over 250,000 acres (1,100 km2) and eventually bordered the Seven-D Ranch in Pecos County in the south/southwest. During the era of the open range, the alternating "odd-numbered" sections of land retained by the State of Texas were freely accessible to the large cattle outfits that owned the "even-numbered" sections of land; therefore, the "U" Ranch controlled an additional 250,000 acres (1,100 km2) of rangeland, bringing the total amount of land owned or controlled by W.R. McEntire's "U" Ranch to roughly 500,000 acres (2,200 km2). During this time, the "U" Ranch grazed upwards of 50,000 head of cattle across five counties, with the cattle being driven to pasturage outside of Texas or to cattle feedlots to increase the animals' weight prior to the final drive to cattle markets in Fort Worth, Kansas City, Chicago, and St. Louis.

Large cattle drives to Colorado City and Fort Worth routinely occurred between 1875 and the mid-1880s, at a time the region was still open rangeland. The "U" Ranch drove the cattle northward to Colorado City, the nearest railroad, and shipped the cattle to Arkansas, Kansas, Nebraska, Wyoming, and Marlow Indian Territory. In 1882, W.R. McEntire, J.B. Wilson, and C.C. Slaughter drove 89 carloads of cattle, mostly overland, to rangeland in Orin Junction, Wyoming that was controlled by the Driskill brothers, who also owned a hotel in Austin, Texas. The cattle weighed 600 to 800 pounds upon arrival and within two years, they weighed almost 1,400 pounds each. By 1888, W.R. McEntire's eldest son, R. Billie McEntire, and his crew were responsible for driving the "U" Ranch cattle to new pasturage outside the state, or often experimenting with various feed types at the feedlots, and subsequently bringing those cattle to the markets as soon as certain market prices were attained. During his last cattle drive in 1893, they began experiencing inclement weather as soon as they left the "U" Ranch towards Colorado City and as they neared the Renderbrook Spade Ranch, a snowy blizzard moved in from the north. R. Billie, knowing the owners, the Snyder brothers, cut the perimeter fence and drove over 1,000 head of cattle southward into the main horse pasture of the Renderbrook Spade Ranch while the McEntire crew weathered the storm at ranch headquarters over several days. With minimal losses after the blizzard, the McEntire crew continued the drive towards Colorado City and the feedlots in Pine Bluff, Arkansas. R. Billie kept the cattle at the feedlots for 10 months waiting for ideal market conditions in Fort Worth. In Arkansas, he married Eudora Fowler and subsequently moved to Dallas to work at American National Bank, which his father, W.R. McEntire, founded and controlled with C.C. Slaughter, the owner of the Lazy S Ranch. R.B. McEntire's younger brother, George, also followed the same path, learning finance at American National Bank in Dallas prior to returning to Sterling County and subsequently either assuming ownership or control of the ranch.

Between 1880 and 1900, W.R. McEntire acquired additional rangeland throughout Glasscock, Howard, Mitchell, Nolan, Sterling, Tom Green, and Reagan Counties, enlarging the "U" Ranch operations to include over 250,000 acres (1,100 km2) with approximately 105,000 acres (424 km2) located in Glasscock and Reagan Counties. The "U" Ranch now extended from 12 miles west of Garden City to Grierson's Spring in Reagan County, included the section of the Goodnight-Loving Trail between the Concho and Pecos Rivers and bordered the Seven-D Ranch in the southwest. Grierson's Spring is located between the head of the Concho River and the Pecos River, about 15 miles southwest of Big Lake in Reagan County and 30 miles east of the Pecos River, while the Seven-D Ranch headquarters was located on Comanche Creek four miles east of Fort Stockton in central Pecos County.

Under the new homestead law, settlers began purchasing the “even-numbered” sections from the state for the benefit of the Common School Fund in 1883. In conjunction with the introduction of the fence, these settlers began owning land that was previously controlled by the large cattle outfits, and this eventually led to the Fence Cutting Wars. This acreage was sold by the state on a first-come, first-served basis with the county advertising the availability of land, which resulted in extremely long lines at the county clerks' offices and increased the likelihood that the desired acreage would not be available. As a result of Common School Fund process, W.R. McEntire, while in Dallas, sent representatives from Tom Green County to acquire as much land as possible and to keep others out of the line until the desired acreage was obtained. North Carolinian James Jefferson Lafayott Glass came to the county in 1883 and signed on with the Sterling Brothers’ Half Circle S outfit. He later homesteaded acreage along the Lacy Creek.

As the era of the open range began to conclude, W.R. McEntire realized that contiguous acreage would be increasingly important to the success of any cattle outfit, and he began quickly purchasing any available acreage with the prospect of establishing a buffer around the "U" Ranch, or selling or bartering that acquisition for adjoining acreage to his primary operation, either under a single operation and single fence line, or perhaps having access to large, disparate ranches that could provide the ability to easily move livestock between operations. As a reaction to the continued encroachment of squatters and homesteaders from the growing settlement of Sterling City, W.R. McEntire purchased 10,000 acres west of Sterling City in 1884, near the intersection of the Lacy Creek and Concho River.

In 1890, W.R. McEntire sold the 105,000 acres (424 km2) in Glasscock and Reagan Counties, including 3,000 head of cattle and 100 horses, to J.B. Slaughter, which subsequently became the first U Lazy S Ranch. In 1898, J.B. Slaughter sold the acreage and moved his cattle and operations to his new U Lazy S Ranch in Borden and Garza Counties.

In 1896, R. Billie McEntire returned to Sterling County and purchased about 10,000 acres which adjoined the "U" Ranch headquarters and included portions of the Kennedy Ranch, Half Circle S Ranch, and the Peacock-Kellogg Horse Ranch.

The era of the large open-range cattle kings had come to a close by 1890, with the MS Ranch and Half Circle S Ranch being bankrupted, and the "U" Ranch in the process of being consolidated into contiguous acreage.

U Ranch Legacy

The derivatives of W.R. McEntire's initial "U" Ranch are currently owned and operated as distinct ranches by his descendants. These ranches are the only remaining segments still in existence of the first large cattle outfit in the region. In 1906, W.R. McEntire divided his ranching estate between his two sons, R. Billie McEntire and George H. McEntire. His daughter, Lula Elizabeth McEntire, received title to the estate not associated with agriculture.

R. Billie McEntire received title to the Harrison Ranch in Dallas, and the n+ Ranch in Sterling County. He also received a cash advance from the dissolution of McEntire and Co. and from investments made in the American National Bank in Dallas. Of the same year, he purchased 10,000 acres in Nolan and Mitchell Counties, and moved his family to Colorado City, Texas, to send his children to school. Eventually, his four sons, Fowler McEntire, James H. McEntire, W.R. McEntire, Jr, and R.B. McEntire, Jr, formed a partnership, the “McEntire Brothers”, which began managing much of R. Billie McEntire's ranching operations. James H. McEntire initially became the primary manager of the ranching operations in Sterling County (about 10,000 acres) while the other three brothers were primarily engaged in Mitchell and Nolan Counties (also around 10,000 acres). This partnership lasted from circa 1915 to 1928, and was dissolved as a result of the brothers becoming owners and subsequently managing their own operations in Sterling County. In 1927, R. Billie McEntire sold the acreage in Sterling County to his sons. Eventually, Fowler and James H. McEntire purchased their brothers' interests, with each owning one-half of the acreage in Sterling County. R. Billie McEntire continued ranching in Mitchell and Nolan Counties until his death in 1937.
 Fowler McEntire's grandson, Mackey McEntire, continues to use the original "U" Ranch brand on his ranch located on the Concho River.
 James H. McEntire brought the Campstool Ranch into its current form by 1925. The ranch was established on the Lacy Creek near the intersection with the Concho River on acreage that was initially acquired by his grandfather, W.R. McEntire, in 1884. After his death in 1937, his wife, Sudie Rawls, managed and operated all aspects of the ranch until 1955, when their daughter, Jamie Sue McEntire Cole, and son-in-law, Bill James Cole, first leased the agricultural production and then eventually became full owners of the ranch in 1981. Under Bill Cole's stewardship, ranching operations were enlarged to include about 35,000 acres across four counties: Crockett, Glasscock, Sterling, and Val Verde. In 1963, a feedlot with a maximum capacity of 32,000 sheep was constructed on the Campstool Ranch in Sterling City. Initially built as a commercial operation for the region, it was later primarily used for the benefit of their livestock and staging of livestock between operations. In 1969, Custom Skins, Inc. was established in San Angelo. The vertical integration into the sheepskin tanning industry was successful, and the company quickly became one of the leading suppliers nationally and globally. In the 1980s, ranching operations were expanded into Colorado, California, and Nevada, and eventually became one of the single largest individual producers of sheep and wool within the United States. To effectively support the multistate expansion and continued growth, Cole Trucking, a livestock transportation company, was established and a fleet of dedicated trucks ranged from Texas to California. Anticipating a peak in market prices in 1989, Bill Cole proactively sold all of the livestock and returned his focus to Texas, purchasing three additional ranches from 1989 to 1992 that totaled 40,000 acres. In 2008, the 9,000-acre Schleicher County ranch was sold. In understanding the need to preserve and proactively restore the natural resources once found on the open rangeland, a standard practice that Bill Cole implemented over 50 years ago in Sterling County, he was recognized by the Crockett County Soil and Water Conservation District for the improvements to the natural resources on his ranch in Crockett and Val Verde Counties – fostering native vegetation through good brush management, wildlife management, and erosion control.

George H. McEntire received title to 23,000 acres and operated the "U" Ranch under a partnership with his father, McEntire & Son. In 1962, George H. McEntire gave his two children, George H. McEntire, Jr. and Virginia McEntire, 16,233 acres each. George H. McEntire, Jr. continued his operations under the "U" Ranch name, while Virginia McEntire operated the acreage as the VJ Ranch. The ranch is currently owned by Ruth Caldwell, daughter of George H. McEntire, Jr.

Fence Cutting Wars

The county suffered droughts in 1883 and 1886–87. The former ignited fence-cutting wars in the county, and the latter of which bankrupted the Half Circle S ranch. Fence Cutting Wars in Texas lasted for close to five years, 1883–1888. As open range areas gave way to farming homesteaders who fenced their land, cattlemen found it more difficult to feed their herds. In some cases, large land owners also fenced public land as their property. As water and grass became increasingly scarce during droughts, homesteaders and ranch-hands began cutting through fences. Newspapers condemned the fence cutters, and property owners employed their own armed security forces. Texas Governor John Ireland prodded a special assembly to order the fence cutters to cease. In response, the legislature made fence-cutting and pasture-burning crimes punishable with prison time, while at the same time regulating the building of fences. While the practice abated, sporadic incidents of related violence continued through 1888.

County established and growth

The county was established and organized in 1891 from Tom Green County. A competition developed between Sterling City and Cummins for the county seat. Sterling City won, and most of the Cummins population moved to Sterling City by the end of the year. Cummins became a ghost town. County voters in 1898 elected to make Sterling a dry county, prohibiting the sale of alcohol within its boundaries.
Sheep ranching was introduced to the area in about 1890. Cotton was first planted in 1889. Sterling City opened its first cotton gin in 1895, with others established later. Eventually, it became more evident that county lands were most suitable for grazing. The cotton gins eventually failed; by 1920, only  in Sterling County were planted in cotton. Ranching continued to expand in the county. Sterling County experienced a brief boom when the number of farms and ranches in the area increased from 131 in 1920 to 176 by 1925.

In 1914, Boy Scout State Encampment was hosted by Colonel W.R. McEntire and George McEntire, Sr, on the "U" Ranch.

The county's economy declined during the Great Depression of the 1930s. Oil discovered in Sterling County in 1947 helped to bail out the area's declining economy. By the beginning of 1991,  of crude had been extracted from within the county.

Geography

Major highways
  U.S. Highway 87
  State Highway 158
  State Highway 163

Adjacent counties
 Mitchell County (north)
 Coke County (east)
 Tom Green County (south)
 Reagan County (southwest)
 Glasscock County (west)
 Howard County (northwest)

Demographics

Note: the US Census treats Hispanic/Latino as an ethnic category. This table excludes Latinos from the racial categories and assigns them to a separate category. Hispanics/Latinos can be of any race.

As of the census of 2000, 1,393 people, 513 households, and 385 families resided in the county. The population density was 2 people per square mile (1/km2). The 633 housing units averaged 1 per square mile. The racial makeup of the county was 62.1% White, 1.1% Black, 2.5% from other races, and 34.5% of the population was Hispanic or Latino of any race.

Of the 513 households, 36.80% had children under the age of 18 living with them, 64.10% were married couples living together, 7.00% had a female householder with no husband present, and 24.80% were not families. About 23% of all households were made up of individuals, and 11.30% had someone living alone who was 65 years of age or older. The average household size was 2.67 and the average family size was 3.15.

In the county, the population was distributed as 28.70% under the age of 18, 6.10% from 18 to 24, 29.70% from 25 to 44, 20.80% from 45 to 64, and 14.60% who were 65 years of age or older. The median age was 38 years. For every 100 females, there were 96.50 males. For every 100 females age 18 and over, there were 95.90 males.

The median income for a household in the county was $35,129, and for a family was $37,813. Males had a median income of $28,173 versus $19,615 for females. The per capita income for the county was $16,972. About 13.90% of families and 16.80% of the population were below the poverty line, including 23.30% of those under age 18 and 15.90% of those age 65 or over.

Communities
 Broome
 Sterling City (county seat)

Politics

See also

 Dry counties
 Recorded Texas Historic Landmarks in Sterling County

References

External links

 
 Inventory of county records, Sterling County Courthouse, Sterling City, Texas, hosted by the Portal to Texas History
 Sterling County Profile from the Texas Association of Counties

 
1891 establishments in Texas
Populated places established in 1891